Pure is the second studio album by the British band The Primitives, released in 1989 as the follow-up to their debut, Lovely. The line-up changed slightly over the course of the previous year: Steve Dullaghan was replaced on the bass guitar by Paul Sampson, who also shared the production duties with Wayne Morris.

The first U.S. single from Pure was "Sick of It", which reached #24 in the UK. Pure also features "Way Behind Me", a single which was actually released shortly after the debut album (rising to #36 on the UK charts in 1988) and added to all future editions of Lovely. "Secrets" was also released as a single; however it stalled just inside the Top 50 (#49 UK). "I'll Be Your Mirror" is a cover of a Velvet Underground song from 1967.

Track listing
All songs written by Paul Court unless indicated otherwise.

"Outside" - 1:54
"Summer Rain" - 3:09 
"Sick of It" - 3:11 
"Shine" - 3:53 
"Dizzy Heights" - 2:35
"All the Way Down" (P.J. Court, Tracy, Dullaghan) - 3:35
"Secrets" - 2:29
"Keep Me in Mind" - 2:35 
"Lonely Streets" - 2:18
"Can't Bring Me Down" - 2:37
"Way Behind Me" (P.J. Court, Tracy) -  3:08
"Never Tell" - 2:53
"Noose" - 3:27
"I'll Be Your Mirror" (Lou Reed) - 2:41
"All the Way Down (Beat Version)" (P.J. Court, Tracy) - 2:21
"I Almost Touched You" - 2:40

Personnel
Tracy Tracy - lead vocals, tambourine
Paul Court - guitar, vocals
Tig Williams - drums
Paul Sampson - bass

Chart performance
The album reached No. 36 on the UK album charts. It spent 15 weeks on the U.S. Billboard 200 album charts and reached its peak position of No. 113 in February 1990.

Notes 

1989 albums
The Primitives albums
RCA Records albums